Yaḥyā ibn al-Ḥakam ibn Abī al-ʿĀṣ (died before 700) was an Umayyad statesman during the caliphate of his nephew, Abd al-Malik. He fought against Caliph Ali at the Battle of the Camel and later moved to Damascus where he was a courtier of the Umayyad caliphs Mu'awiya I and Yazid I. He was appointed governor of Palestine by Abd al-Malik and is credited in an inscription for building part of a road connecting Damascus to Jerusalem in 692. He served as governor of Medina for a year in 694/95 and afterward led a series of expeditions against the Byzantine Empire along the northern frontier of Syria.

Life
Yahya was a son of al-Hakam ibn Abi al-As and a younger half-brother of Caliph Marwan I (r. 684–685). His mother hailed from the Banu Murra tribe of Ghatafan. He fought alongside Marwan and their brother Abd al-Rahman and other senior leaders of the Quraysh against Caliph Ali at the Battle of the Camel in 656. Ali was victorious and Yahya, wounded, found safety with a member of the large Banu Tamim tribe in Basra. This tribesman escorted him to the headquarters of his distant cousin, the governor of Syria, Mu'awiya ibn Abi Sufyan, in Damascus. He stayed in the city through the course of Mu'awiya's caliphate (661–680) and that of his son and successor, Yazid I. Yahya publicly condemned the slaying of Ali's son and the Islamic prophet Muhammad's grandson, Husayn, by Yazid's army at the Battle of Karbala in 680.

At some point between 685 and 694,  Yahya's nephew, the caliph Abd al-Malik ibn Marwan, appointed him the governor of Palestine. Yahya was mentioned in an inscription on a milestone found near Samakh that credited him for supervising the construction of a road through the Fiq pass in the Golan Heights on behalf of Abd al-Malik. The inscription dates to May/June 692, making it the oldest known Islamic inscription about the foundation of a road.

In 694/95, Yahya was appointed governor of Medina. He was recalled to Damascus in the following year, during which he led a summer campaign against the Byzantines in the general vicinity of Malatya and al-Massisa. In 697/98, he led a campaign against the Byzantine fortress at Marj al-Shahm. This may have occurred in 698/699. Yahya died prior to 700. His tombstone was found in Katzrin in the Golan Heights. The epitaph, in Kufic Arabic script, reads "May my Lord have mercy on Yahya ibn al-Hakam and forgive him".

Family and descendants
One of Yahya's wives during his governorship of Medina was Umm al-Qasim al-Sughra, a daughter of a leading companion of Muhammad, Abd al-Rahman ibn Awf. A son of Yahya, Yusuf, served as governor of Mosul toward the end of Abd al-Malik's reign, and his son al-Hurr and grandson Yahya ibn al-Hurr each served terms in the province in 727–732 and 732, respectively. One of Yahya's daughters, Amina, was wed to Abd al-Malik's son, the future caliph Hisham. Afterward, another daughter, Umm Hakim, who, like her mother Zaynab bint Abd al-Rahman, was well-known for her beauty and love for wine, married Hisham and bore the latter five sons, including Sulayman, Maslama, Yazid al-Afqam, and Mu'awiya. The latter's son, Abd al-Rahman I, went on to found the Umayyad Emirate of Cordoba in modern-day Spain in 756.

References

Bibliography

690s deaths
7th-century Arabs
People of the First Fitna
Umayyad dynasty
Umayyad governors of Medina
Umayyad governors of Palestine
Umayyad people of the Arab–Byzantine wars